Evergreen Cemetery is a historic cemetery in Jacksonville, Florida. It was added to the National Register of Historic Places on April 8, 2011. It is located at 4535 North Main Street, in the city's Northside area.

History
In 1880 organizers of Evergreen Cemetery conceived of establishing a centrally located cemetery in Jacksonville. J. J. Daniel and directors of Evergreen purchased 200 acres of land for their project at $25 an acre. The first burial at Evergreen Cemetery took place on April 8, 1881, for Margaret Jamison. An on-site railroad depot was built in the cemetery for better access to visitors via the Jacksonville-Fernandina Railroad. A section of the cemetery was established in 1885 for those who died during the Yellow fever epidemic in Jacksonville. At the turn of the 20th century, Evergreen became a non-profit association. First Board President Arthur G. Cummer and the board purchased an additional 22 acres from nearby Woodlawn Cemetery. The City of Jacksonville ceded back its pauper cemetery to Evergreen north of the cemetery. In 1969 an on-site business office was built near the entrance to the cemetery.

Notable burials
James McNair Baker (1821–1892), Confederate States Senator from Florida (1862–1865)
Albert H. Blanding (1876–1970), United States Army Major General
Napoleon B. Broward (1857–1910), 19th governor of Florida (1905–1909)
Nathan Philemon Bryan (1872–1935), United States Senator from Florida (1911–1917)
William James Bryan (1876–1908), United States Senator from Florida (1907–1908)
Walter M. Chandler (1867–1935), United States Representative from New York (1913–1919, 1921–1923)
Cora Crane (1868–1911), journalist and wife of author Stephen Crane
John Jackson Dickison (1816–1902), Confederate States Army Colonel
Joe Dobson (1917–1994), Major League Baseball pitcher
J. B. C. Drew (1843–1924), 10th Florida Attorney General (1871–1872)
Duncan U. Fletcher (1859–1936), United States Senator from Florida (1909–1936)
Ben Geraghty (1912–1963), Minor League Baseball manager
George Couper Gibbs (1879–1946), 26th Florida Attorney General (1938–1941)
Noble A. Hull (1827–1907), United States Representative from Florida (1879–1881)
Claude L'Engle (1868–1911), United States Representative from Florida (1913–1915)
John W. Martin (1884–1958), 24th Governor of Florida (1925–1928)
A. R. Meek (1834–1888), 8th Florida Attorney General (1868–1870)
Maxey Dell Moody (1883–1949), founder of M. D. Moody & Sons, Inc.
Mary A. Nolan (1842-1925), suffragist
Alexander St. Clair-Abrams (1912–1992), Florida State Senator (1953–1960)
James Taliaferro (1837–1934), United States Senator from Florida (1899–1911)
Grace Wilbur Trout (1864–1965), suffragette

See also
Duval County, Florida
National Register of Historic Places listings in Duval County, Florida

References

National Register of Historic Places in Jacksonville, Florida
Geography of Jacksonville, Florida
Cemeteries on the National Register of Historic Places in Florida
Northside, Jacksonville
Cemeteries established in the 1880s